KOPB-FM (91.5 FM) is a radio station licensed to Portland, Oregon, United States. The station is owned by Oregon Public Broadcasting and airs its news and talk programming, consisting of syndicated programming from NPR, APM and PRX, as well as locally produced offerings.

KOPB-FM serves as the flagship station for OPB. It is a primary entry point station for the Emergency Alert System.

External links
opb.org

OPB-FM
OPB-FM
NPR member stations
Radio stations established in 1952
1952 establishments in Oregon